Janahb Pakal also known as Janaab Pakal, Pakal I or Pakal the Elder, (died 6 March 612), was a nobleman and possible ajaw of the Maya city-state of Palenque.

Biography 
Pakal’s dynastic position is not entirely certain, though he may have been the grandfather or brother of Ajen Yohl Mat. It seems that he never ascended to the high-kingship in his own right. He was the father of Lady Sak K'uk', one of the rare queens regnant of Maya history. His wife or mother was Yohl Ik'nal. During reign of his probable brother Ajen Yohl Mat, Palenque was invaded on April 4, 611 by Scroll Serpent, ruler of the Kaan kingdom (Calakmul). They were dead c. sixteen months later. In later years, he is ascribed a full emblem glyph. He should not be confused with his grandson, K'inich Janaab Pakal I who during a long reign of some 68 years was responsible for the construction or extension of some of Palenque’s most notable surviving inscriptions and monumental architecture.

Sources 

610s deaths
Rulers of Palenque
7th-century monarchs in North America
Year of birth unknown
7th century in the Maya civilization